The Source was originally an alias for the songwriting team of Anthony B. Stephens, Arnecia Michelle Harris and John Bellamy.

Biography
The Source wrote the 1986 single release "You Got the Love", which featured Candi Staton on vocals. This was released on Source Records.

In 1989, DJ Eren, a club DJ in London, put Candi Staton's vocals (from the "House Apella" version) over an early house track by Frankie Knuckles and Jamie Principle called "Your Love", which became a club hit. This version was also released in 1989 by British producer/DJ John Truelove as The Source, on a vinyl bootleg EP known as "Love/Rock".

Truelove then adopted the name The Source for himself, and continued releasing records using the name. The mash-up of "You Got the Love", credited to The Source featuring Candi Staton, charted in 1991 in an official release, reaching number 4 on the UK Singles Chart. In 1997, it was remixed and released again by Truelove, this time under the alias Now Voyager, reaching one spot higher at number 3.

Truelove signed with XL Recordings in 1997 and released a 12-inch EP called Clouds, featuring four different mixes of the Chaka Khan song "Clouds" sung by Khan's sister, Yvonne Stevens, a.k.a. Taka Boom.

In 2006, "You Got the Love" was remixed and re-released yet again, reaching number 7.

In 2009, Florence + the Machine released a version titled "You've Got the Love" from the album Lungs.

Now Voyager began as a band started by Truelove in 1996. He recruited Louise De Fraine (vocals), Chris Harvey (guitar) and Larry Lush (programming, keyboards). Despite writing and showcasing an album of material, the band failed to secure a significant record deal.

Context
Candi Staton was unaware of the record's existence until she was told that she had a number 1 single: "They were calling my house saying I had a number one record in England, and I said, 'What song? I haven't released any song.' When they told me it was "You Got the Love", I said I'd never made a record called that. Then I got off the phone and realised - it was the one from the diet video! Which was never supposed to be put on a record at all".

Critical acclaim
"You Got the Love" was chosen by the BBC as one of the top fifty singles of the 1990s as part of its Pop on Trial series.

Discography

Others
2009: "You've Got the Love" by Florence and the Machine (for chart positions, see song page)

References

External links
 "The Source interview", Music Towers

English record producers
English dance musicians
English house musicians
English house music groups
English songwriters
British musical trios
Positiva Records artists